Water polo was first introduced to the program of the Central American and Caribbean Games (CACGs) in 1938 in Panama City, and has been contested at every edition since.

Results summary

Men's tournament

Women's tournament

References

 
Central American and Caribbean Games
Central American and Caribbean Games
Sports at the Central American and Caribbean Games